The R161 road is a regional road in Ireland. It runs from Navan in County Meath to Kinnegad in County Westmeath.

References

Regional roads in the Republic of Ireland
Roads in County Meath